Ropica signata is a species of beetle in the family Cerambycidae. It was described by Pic in 1932.

References

signata
Beetles described in 1932